The castle of Banyeres (Alicante), Valencian Community, (Spain) is an Almohad fortress built in the 13th century, which is situated on the tossal de l'Àguila (Valencian), English: 'Hill of the Eagle',  in the geographical center of Banyeres, with an elevation of 830 meters above the sea level.

The castle, irregularly shaped, has two enclosures and adapts to the ground. His most significant element is his tower of 17 meters. It has a square ground plan and three heights and is made of rammed earth. The remains of walls, also made with mud, they have pockets made in later period and dominated the arches with voussoirs. Within the grounds there is a cistern and a chapel.

It is currently the headquarters of Banyeres festive museum (Museu Fester).

See also 

 Route of the Castles of Vinalopó
 Barchell Castle
 Cocentaina Castle

References 
 Este artículo toma como referencia el texto del B.I.C. incoado por la Consejería de Cultura de la Generalidad Valenciana

External links 

 Article about the Banyeres Castle 

Castles in the Valencian Community
Buildings and structures in the Province of Alicante
Bien de Interés Cultural landmarks in the Province of Alicante